Harlay is a French surname. Notable people with the surname include:

Nicolas de Harlay, seigneur de Sancy (1546-1629)
Christophe de Harlay, Count of Beaumont (1570-1615) French ambassador to England
Achille Harlay de Sancy (1581-1646)
François II de Harlay Archbishop of Rouen (1614-1651)
François de Harlay de Champvallon (1651-1695)

French-language surnames